Aberdeen F.C. competed in the inaugural Scottish Premier League, Scottish League Cup and Scottish Cup in season 1998–99.

Results

Scottish Premier League

Final standings

Scottish League Cup

Scottish Cup

References

 AFC Heritage Trust

Aberdeen F.C. seasons
Aberdeen